Ontario South was a provincial electoral riding in Ontario, Canada. Created in 1867 at the time of Confederation, it was abolished in 1933 before the 1934 election. It was briefly recreated in 1967 and abolished again in 1975. It was last contested in 1971.

Members of the Provincial Parliament

References

Former provincial electoral districts of Ontario